Kirill Pavlovich Morozov (born 11 April 1995) is a Russian football player who plays for FC Volga Ulyanovsk.

Club career
He made his debut in the Russian Football National League for FC Irtysh Omsk on 1 August 2020 in a game against FC Yenisey Krasnoyarsk, as a starter.

References

External links
 
 Profile by Russian Football National League
 

1995 births
Sportspeople from Lipetsk Oblast
People from Yelets
Living people
Russian footballers
Russia youth international footballers
Association football midfielders
FC Krasnodar-2 players
FC Krasnodar players
FC Zenit-Izhevsk players
FK Dainava Alytus players
FC Irtysh Omsk players
FC Tyumen players
FC Volga Ulyanovsk players
Russian Second League players
Russian First League players
I Lyga players
Russian expatriate footballers
Expatriate footballers in Lithuania
Russian expatriate sportspeople in Lithuania